In June 1981, fourteen-year old Marion Crofts was raped and murdered in Aldershot, England. The case is notable for the 21 year delay in justice before former soldier Tony Jasinskyj was found guilty as a result of advances in DNA testing and sentenced to life in prison. He is up for parole in 2022, despite him never having admitted his guilt and the DNA evidence proving that the chances of the perpetrator being anyone other than Jasinskyj were 1 in a billion.

Marion was the youngest of three daughters of Trevor and Anne Crofts. On Saturday 6 June 1981 she was cycling the four miles from her home at Basingbourne Close in Fleet, Hampshire to attend a clarinet lesson at The Wavell School in Farnborough. Ordinarily her father drove her there but on this occasion he was playing in a cricket match. Her route took her along Laffans Road in Aldershot alongside the Basingstoke Canal. Here between 9.30 and 10.00 am she was attacked and beaten into unconsciousness, leaving her with severe bruising and a bleed on the brain. After being dragged into the wooded area by the side of the road she was raped and murdered. The attacker left traces of his DNA in and on her body as well as on her jeans and her left sock. Her body was then hidden in the undergrowth where it was found later that day by a police dog handler. Her clarinet case was flung into the nearby Basingstoke Canal where it was later retrieved.

Tony Jasinskyj was a lance corporal in the Army Catering Corps based in Aldershot and was living in army married quarters about a mile and a half away from the murder scene with his pregnant wife Lynn Gowans, whom he had married in 1976. He was among hundreds of men questioned as to their whereabouts at the time of the murder.

Following the murder DNA evidence was deliberately withheld in the expectation that testing techniques would advance in the future which would find a match. In the meantime the DNA samples from her body and clothing were carefully sealed to avoid cross contamination and documented in detail. The case was shown in a reconstruction at Laffans Road on the BBC One's Crimewatch on 22 February 2000.

The murder remained a cold case until in 1999 a DNA profile was obtained from the withheld material using the new Low copy number (LCN) testing technique. This was continually checked against the UK National DNA Database for the next two years until a match was eventually found for Tony Jasinskyj, who by then had been discharged from the Army Catering Corps and was working as a security guard in Leicester where he was living at Kegworth Avenue with his second wife, Michelle, having been divorced from his first wife since 1984. On being arrested for assaulting his wife police took a routine DNA sample and fed details into a databank. On finding a match Jasinskyj was arrested in April 2001 and charged with the rape and murder of Marion Crofts in 1981. He denied the charges.

At his trial at Winchester Crown Court experts pointed out that DNA material from Crofts was present in the sample taken from her body and the clothing she had been wearing. The jury were told that the DNA match to Jasinskyj was one in a billion. After a four week trial the jury deliberated for three hours before finding Jasinskyj guilty of both charges. He was sentenced to life imprisonment for the murder and to 10 years for the rape, to run concurrently. In sentencing him Judge Michael Brodrick told Jasinskyj that he had committed a "cruel and callous murder" and had given Croft's family 21 years of suffering as they thought of "the final, dreadful, brutal moments of her life".

In 2014 Jasinskyj appealed his life sentence, arguing before Lady Justice Macur QC, Lord Justice Phillips and Judge Neil Ford QC at the Court of Appeal in London that the DNA evidence produced at his 2002 trial was 'flawed' as it contained material from the victim suggesting that the murderer had a chromosome disorder - meaning he had been wrongfully convicted. The Appeal Judge Lord Justice Phillips said the original verdict was "entirely safe" and dismissed Jasinskyj's claim as "fanciful", stating that his "fixation on an anomaly" could not outweigh the one in a billion probability that Jasinskyj had committed the rape and murder.

Whilst in prison Jasinskyj has regularly had letters and poems published in the national prisoners' newspaper Inside Time, in which he has complained about prison life, and in 2017 he described himself as "yet another victim". In 2018 he said he was a "traumatised hater". In November 2019 he complained that he did not have a TV in his cell because he maintained his innocence. In September 2021, however, he claimed he felt 'remorse'.

Jasinskyj has been imprisoned at HM Prison Littlehey since 2017. In April 2022 the parole board revealed that they would be considering his case for release and that he could be released within weeks. Jasinskyj previously complained in 2019 that his prison was a 200-mile round trip to Aldershot, which he described as being his home, indicating that he will likely move back to Aldershot (the location of the murder of Crofts) if released.

See also
Murders of Margaret Johnson and Ann Lee – unsolved 1982 murders nearby in Aldershot which have been linked to Crofts' murder
List of kidnappings
Active UK cold cases where the offender's DNA is known:
Murder of Deborah Linsley
Murders of Eve Stratford and Lynne Weedon
Murders of Jacqueline Ansell-Lamb and Barbara Mayo
Murder of Lyn Bryant
Murder of Lindsay Rimer
Murder of Janet Brown
Murder of Linda Cook 
Murder of Melanie Hall
Batman rapist, subject to Britain's longest-running serial rape investigation

References

Aldershot
1980s in Hampshire
2000s trials
1981 murders in the United Kingdom
Genetics in the United Kingdom
Murder trials
June 1981 events in the United Kingdom
Murder in Hampshire
Trials in England
Murdered English children
Incidents of violence against girls